The Sudanese Union – African Democratic Rally (US-RDA) was a political party in Mali.

History
The party was formed in 1945 by Mamadou Konaté and Modibo Keita under the name Sudanese Bloc (Bloc Soudanais).  The following year, they affiliated themselves with the African Democratic Rally (RDA), the interterritorial coalition of anti-colonial political parties active in French West Africa.

The 1957 elections saw the US-RDA win 57 of the 70 seats. Shortly after the elections, the Union of the Populations of Bandiagara merged into the US-RDA, giving it a total of 64 seats. When Konaté died in 1958, Keita gained full control of the party.

The 1959 elections saw the US-RDA win all 80 seats in the Legislative Assembly, and it became the sole legal party the following year. Elections were held in 1964, but with no opposition, the party retained all 80 seats.

Following a coup in 1968 by Moussa Traoré, the party was banned. Over the next two decades, the US-RDA remained underground until re-emerging in 1990, when it joined the growing democratic movement against Traoré's dictatorship, becoming part of the Alliance for Democracy in Mali (ADEMA).

In the 1992 parliamentary elections, the first multi-party vote since 1959, the US-RDA won eight of the 129 seats, emerging as the third-largest party behind ADEMA (76 seats) and the National Congress for Democratic Initiative (9). The party put forward Tiéoulé Mamadou Konaté as its candidate for the 1992 presidential elections. He finished in second place in the first round of voting, but was beaten by ADEMA's Alpha Oumar Konaré in the run-off by 69% to 31%.

The May 1997 presidential elections saw the party nominate Seydou Kouyate as its candidate, but he finished sixth with just 1.6% of the vote. The party boycotted the July 1997 parliamentary elections, following the annulment of the April 1997 elections.

In 1998 the party split into two factions, one of which followed Daba Diawara to become the Independence, Democracy and Solidarity Party (PIDS) in 2001. The US-RDA contested the 2002 parliamentary elections as part of the Convergence for Alternation and Change alliance, which won 10 seats.

The party joined the Alliance for Democracy and Progress for the 2007 parliamentary elections. The alliance won 113 seats, of which the US-RDA took one.

In August 2010 it merged with the Bloc for Democracy and African Integration to form the Malian Union for the African Democratic Rally.

Electoral history

Presidential elections

National Assembly elections

References

Sections of the Rassemblement Démocratique Africain
Defunct political parties in Mali
Formerly banned socialist parties
Pan-Africanism in Mali
Pan-Africanist political parties in Africa
Parties of one-party systems
Socialism in Mali
1945 establishments in French Sudan
Political parties established in 1945
Political parties disestablished in 2010